Alejandro Torres Román (born 18 June 1982 in Palma de Mallorca, Balearic Islands), known as Chando, is a Spanish former professional footballer who played as a striker.

References

External links

1982 births
Living people
Spanish footballers
Footballers from Palma de Mallorca
Association football forwards
Segunda División players
Segunda División B players
Tercera División players
RCD Mallorca B players
Betis Deportivo Balompié footballers
CF Reus Deportiu players
Lorca Deportiva CF footballers
Orihuela CF players
Zamora CF footballers
Villarreal CF B players
Real Murcia players
Girona FC players
CD Atlético Baleares footballers
Cypriot First Division players
AEK Larnaca FC players
Spanish expatriate footballers
Expatriate footballers in Cyprus
Spanish expatriate sportspeople in Cyprus